The below table gives a list of firearms that can fire the 7.62×51mm NATO cartridge, first developed and used in the 1950s for the M14 rifle, and later in 1957 under STANAG 2310 was adopted as the standard infantry rifle cartridge for NATO. Not all countries that use weapons chambered in this caliber are in NATO.

This table is sortable for every column.

See also 
List of 5.56×45mm NATO firearms
7.62×54mmR
.30-06 Springfield
.303 British
7.5×54mm

References

NATO 5.56x45mm